Laurent Héloïse (born 13 May 1985) is a French professional footballer who plays as a defender for Championnat National 3 club AC Amiens.

References

External links
 Laurent Héloïse at foot-national.com
 
 

1985 births
Living people
Sportspeople from Amiens
French footballers
Association football defenders
Olympique Saint-Quentin players
En Avant Guingamp players
USL Dunkerque players
Vendée Poiré-sur-Vie Football players
US Boulogne players
Amiens SC players
FC Chambly Oise players
AC Amiens players
Ligue 2 players
Championnat National players
Championnat National 3 players
Footballers from Hauts-de-France